Galashiels Golf Club is a golf course to the north of Galashiels, Scotland. The course was reduced from 18 holes to 9 holes in 2008.

History
Founded in 1884, the nine-hole course was laid out around Appletreeleaves House and alongside the Ladhope Burn. In 1895, a breakaway group founded Torwoodlee Golf Club and at a special meeting, Galashiels Golf Club was disbanded on 3 August 1897 when it was agreed that all the assets and trophies would be handed over to Torwoodlee.

Galashiels Golf Club was reformed 15 years later on the 21 August 1912, and the following October, H Roberts, the proprietor of the Ladhope Estate, gifted the land to the people of Galashiels the area now known as Ladhope Recreation Ground. Roberts donated more land to the people of Galashiels and on 14 July 1914, Galashiels Golf Club commenced with the development of an 18-hole layout that was designed by James Braid.

Braid won his first British Open in 1901 and subsequently won again four times, and was runner up on three occasions – all of this in the space of 10 years. Other notable clubs such as Gleneagles, Carnoustie, Royal Musselburgh, Dalmahoy and Royal Burgess were among the 200 courses designed by him. He was also a founder member and President of the PGA, and was instrumental in laying the foundation of the professional game as we know it today.

The Galashiels Tournament, a professional event sponsored to the tune of £300 by the merchants of Galashiels, was staged on 19–20 May 1920, attracting an impressive field. With the advantage of local knowledge, James Braid took the honours with Harry Vardon the runner up.

References

Golf clubs and courses in the Scottish Borders
1884 establishments in Scotland
Sports venues completed in 1884
Galashiels